The 2021 Atlético Ottawa season was the second season in the history of Atlético Ottawa. In addition to the Canadian Premier League, the club competed in the Canadian Championship.

Season review

Pre-season 

On 29 March 2021 the club announced their pre-season training camp plans in Spain. The training camp began on 1 April 2021 and took place at Los Angeles de San Rafael in Segovia before continuing at Centro Deportivo Wanda Alcalá de Henares in Alcalá de Henares. On June 3, after nine weeks in Spain, the club returned to Canada to begin quarantine before returning to training.

Regular season

The Kickoff 

On 7 June 2021 the Canadian Premier League announced that the beginning of the 2021 regular season would occur in a bubble environment in Winnipeg, Manitoba. "The Kickoff", as it was branded, would occur between 26 June and 24 July and all matches would take place at IG Field. The club began training in Winnipeg on 17 June before playing in the season's inaugural match on 26 June, a 1–0 victory over FC Edmonton.

Current squad 
As of June 22, 2021

Transfers

In

Transferred in

Loans in

Draft picks 
Atlético Ottawa selected the following players in the 2021 CPL–U Sports Draft on January 29, 2021. Draft picks are not automatically signed to the team roster. Only those who are signed to a contract will be listed as transfers in.

Out

Transferred out

Loans out

Pre-season friendlies

Competitions

Canadian Premier League

Table

Post-Bubble Results Summary

Results by Match

Matches

Canadian Championship

Statistics

Squad and statistics 

|-
! colspan="14" style="background:#dcdcdc; text-align:center"| Goalkeepers

|-
! colspan="14" style="background:#dcdcdc; text-align:center"| Defenders

|-
! colspan="14" style="background:#dcdcdc; text-align:center"| Midfielders

|-
! colspan="14" style="background:#dcdcdc; text-align:center"| Forwards

|}

Top scorers 
{| class="wikitable sortable alternance"  style="font-size:85%; text-align:center; line-height:14px; width:85%;"
|-
!width=10|Rank
!width=10|Nat.
! scope="col" style="width:275px;"|Player
!width=10|Pos.
!width=80|Canadian Premier League
!width=80|Canadian Championship
!width=80|TOTAL
|-
|rowspan=1|1|||| Malcolm Shaw || FW || 10 || 0 ||9
|-
|rowspan=1|2|||| Brian Wright || FW || 6 || 1 ||7
|-
|rowspan=1|3|||| Ryan Telfer || MF || 3 || 0 ||3
|-
|rowspan=4|4|||| Miguel Acosta || DF || 2 || 0 ||2
|-
||| Antoine Coupland || MF || 2 || 0 ||2
|-
||| Viti Martínez || MF || 1 || 1 ||2
|-
||| Alberto Soto || MF || 2 || 0 ||2
|-
|rowspan=4|8|||| Matthew Arnone || DF || 1 || 0 ||1
|-
||| Drew Beckie || DF || 1 || 0 ||1
|-
||| Ben McKendry || MF || 1 || 0 ||1
|-
||| Zach Verhoven || MF || 1 || 0 ||1
|-
|- class="sortbottom"
| colspan="4"|Totals||30||2||32

Top assists 
{| class="wikitable sortable alternance"  style="font-size:85%; text-align:center; line-height:14px; width:85%;"
|-
!width=10|Rank
!width=10|Nat.
! scope="col" style="width:275px;"|Player
!width=10|Pos.
!width=80|Canadian Premier League
!width=80|Canadian Championship
!width=80|TOTAL
|-
|rowspan=1|1|||| Zach Verhoven       || MF || 6 || 0 ||6
|-
|rowspan=3|2|||| Chris Mannella                   || MF || 2 || 0 ||2
|-
||| Viti Martínez                    || MF || 2 || 0 ||2
|-
||| Alberto Soto || MF || 2 || 0 ||2
|-
|rowspan=7|5|||| Miguel Acosta || DF || 1 || 0 ||1
|-
||| Drew Beckie         || DF || 1 || 0 ||1
|-
||| Ben McKendry || MF || 1 || 0 ||1
|-
||| Vashon Neufville || DF || 1 || 0 ||1
|-
||| Malcolm Shaw || FW || 1 || 0 ||1
|-
||| Tevin Shaw                       || MF || 1 || 0 ||1
|-
||| Brian Wright                     || FW || 1 || 0 ||1
|-
|- class="sortbottom"
| colspan="4"|Totals||17||0||17

Clean sheets 
{| class="wikitable sortable alternance"  style="font-size:85%; text-align:center; line-height:14px; width:85%;"
|-
!width=10|Rank
!width=10|Nat.
! scope="col" style="width:275px;"|Player
!width=80|Canadian Premier League
!width=80|Canadian Championship
!width=80|TOTAL
|-
|1|||| Dylon Powley      || 3 || 0 ||3
|-
|- class="sortbottom"
| colspan="3"|Totals||3|| 0 ||3

Disciplinary record 
{| class="wikitable sortable alternance"  style="font-size:85%; text-align:center; line-height:14px; width:85%;"
|-
!rowspan="2" width=10|No.
!rowspan="2" width=10|Pos.
!rowspan="2" width=10|Nat.
!rowspan="2" scope="col" style="width:275px;"|Player
!colspan="2" width=80|Canadian Premier League
!colspan="2" width=80|Canadian Championship
!colspan="2" width=80|TOTAL
|-
! !!  !!  !!  !!  !! 
|-
|1||GK|||| Dylon Powley                         || 1 || 0 || 0 || 0 ||1||0
|-
|2||DF|||| Drew Beckie                          || 6 || 0 || 0 || 0 ||6||0
|-
|3||DF|||| Milovan Kapor                        || 4 || 0 || 0 || 0 ||4||0
|-
|5||MF|||| Viti Martínez                        || 2 || 1 || 0 || 0 ||2||1
|-
|6||MF|||| Chris Mannella                       || 4 || 0 || 0 || 0 ||4||0
|-
|7||MF|||| Ryan Telfer                          || 4 || 1 || 0 || 0 ||4||1
|-
|8||MF|||| Ben McKendry                         || 7 || 1 || 0 || 0 ||7||1
|-
|9||FW|||| Shawn-Claud Lawson                   || 1 || 0 || 0 || 0 ||1||0
|-
|10||MF|||| Alberto Soto|| 3 || 0 || 0 || 0 ||3||0
|-
|16||MF|||| Zach Verhoven                       || 5 || 0 || 0 || 0 ||5||0
|-
|17||DF|||| Miguel Acosta  || 7 || 0 || 0 || 0 ||7||0
|-
|18||MF|||| Tevin Shaw                          || 7 || 0 || 0 || 0 ||7||0
|-
|20||DF|||| Nyal Higgins                        || 2 || 1 || 0 || 0 ||2||1
|-
|22||MF|||| Rafael Núñez|| 3 || 0 || 0 || 0 ||3||0
|-
|23||DF|||| Matthew Arnone                      || 1 || 1 || 0 || 0 ||3||0
|-
|44||DF|||| Vashon Neufville                    || 4 || 0 || 0 || 0 ||4||0
|-
|- class="sortbottom"
| colspan="4"|Totals                                          ||58||5||0||0||58||5

Notes

References

External links

Atlético Ottawa seasons
Atleti
Atleti